The 1st Okinawa International Movie Festival was held from March 19 to March 22, 2009 and took place at the American Village at Mihama Chatan-cho in Okinawa City. The inaugural events saw 38 films being shown and was supported by the Ministries of Economy, Trade and Industry, and Foreign Affairs, along with the Cabinet Office in Okinawa.

Most of the films for the first Okinawa International Movie Festival were shown free of charge, with a few priced at ¥800/ ¥400 for adults/ children. The Chatan Town Sunset Beach also hosted performances by Okinawan artists Rimi Natsukawa and the Rinken Band.

The Competition Grand Prix was awarded to Japanese director Katsuhide Motoki for his film Battle League Horumo.

Official selection
The official selection of films shown in competition included three domestic films out of 8 in competition, all of which were given their world premiers. The five competing foreign films were given their Japan premier at the festival.

Competition
The following films were selected as In Competition:

Out of Competition
The following films were screened out of competition:
Special Invitation

Special Screening

Yoshimoto Special Presentation (all world premieres)

Jury

Competition
 Kim Dong Ho, Executive Chairman of Pusan International Film Festival
 Jerry Zucker, Writer & director from the United States
 Somemaru Hayashiya, Comic storyteller
 Gordon Chan, Hong Kong filmmaker
 You (actress), Japanese actress
 Bokunen Naka, Woodblock artist

Awards

Official selection

In Competition
The Okinawa International Movie Festival "Laugh & Peace" Competition Grand Prix was won by the Japanese-language film Battle League Horumo directed by Katsuhide Motoki.

See also
 Okinawa International Movie Festival

References

External links
 Okinawa International Movie Festival official website (in English)
 Official Okinawa International Movie Festival Facebook Page

Film festivals in Japan
March 2009 events in Japan
2009 film festivals
2009 festivals in Asia
2009 in Japanese cinema

ja:沖縄国際映画祭